Denis Maurice O'Conor (1840 – 26 July 1883) was an Irish barrister and Liberal Party politician who represented County Sligo in the House of Commons.

The second son of Denis O'Conor, O'Conor Don and the brother of Charles Owen O'Conor, O'Conor Don, Denis Maurice O'Conor was educated at Downside School and the University of London, graduating MA in 1861 and LLD in 1866. He was called to the bar by the Middle Temple in Easter Term, 1866. A magistrate for County Roscommon, he was High Sheriff of Roscommon for 1865.

A Liberal and a Home Ruler, O'Conor represented County Sligo in the House of Commons from December 1868 until his death, at his residence in Queen's Gate, Kensington, on 26 July 1883.

O'Conor married Ellen Isabella, the eldest daughter of Rev. W. T. Kevill Davies of Croft Castle, Herefordshire with whom he had a son.

References

  ebooks

External links 
 

1840 births
1883 deaths
People educated at Downside School
Alumni of the University of London
Members of the Parliament of the United Kingdom for County Sligo constituencies (1801–1922)
UK MPs 1868–1874
UK MPs 1874–1880
UK MPs 1880–1885
Irish Liberal Party MPs
Denis Maurice
High Sheriffs of Roscommon